River Plate took part both in the Uruguayan Primera División, and 2020 Copa Sudamericana. Season was abruptly suspended in March 2020, due to COVID-19 outbreaks appearences all over the country, and resumed on August.

Transfer Window

Summer 2020

In

Out

Winter 2020

In

Out

Squad

First team squad

Top Scorers 

Last updated on Mar 31, 2021

Disciplinary Record 

Last updated on Mar 31, 2021

Primera División

Apertura 2020

League table

Results by round

Matches 

1: Fourth round was suspended on March 14th due to Coronavirus outbreak appearances all over the country .

2: The match was suspended after 20 minutes due to stormy weather. To be resumed on September 16. .

Intermedio 2020 (Group B)

League table

Results by round

Matches

Clausura 2020

League table

Results by round

Matches 

1:  River Plate were awarded two points and Fénix were deducted one point due to Fénix fielding the ineligible player Bryan Olivera during the Torneo Clausura match between both teams. .

Overall

League table

2020 Copa Sudamericana

First Stage 

River Plate won 3-1 on aggregate score and advanced to the second stage.

Second Stage 

River Plate won 4-2 on aggregate score and advanced to the Round of 16.

Round of 16 

Tied 2–2 on aggregate, Universidad Católica won on away goals and advanced to the quarter-finals (Match S4).

References

River Plate Montevideo seasons
River Plate